Ziaran (also Romanized as Zīārān) is a village in Ziaran Rural District, in the Central District of Abyek County, Qazvin Province, Iran. Population of Ziaran is 7,103. People of Ziaran speak an Iranian language named
Tati.

References 

Populated places in Abyek County